Plutonium(IV) fluoride is a chemical compound with the formula (PuF4). It is a brown solid but can appear a variety of colors depending on the grain size, purity, moisture content, lighting, and presence of contaminants. Its primary use in the United States has been as an intermediary product in the production of plutonium metal for nuclear weapons usage.

Formation 
Plutonium(IV) fluoride is produced in the reaction between plutonium dioxide (PuO2) or plutonium(III) fluoride (PuF3) with hydrofluoric acid (HF) in a stream of oxygen (O2) at 450 to 600 °C. The main purpose of the oxygen stream is to avoid reduction of the product by hydrogen gas, small amounts of which are often found in HF.

PuO2 + O2 + 4 HF → PuF4 + O2 + 2 H2O
4 PuF3 + O2 + 4 HF → 4 PuF4 + 2 H2O

Laser irradiation of plutonium hexafluoride (PuF6) at wavelengths under 520 nm causes it to decompose into plutonium pentafluoride (PuF5) and fluorine; if this is continued, plutonium(IV) fluoride is obtained.

Properties 
In terms of its structure, solid plutonium(IV) fluoride features 8-coordinate Pu centers interconnected by doubly bridging fluoride ligands.

Reaction of plutonium tetrafluoride with barium, calcium, or lithium at 1200 °C give Pu metal:

PuF4 + 2 Ba → 2 BaF2 + Pu
PuF4 + 2 Ca → 2 CaF2 + Pu
PuF4 + 4 Li → 4 LiF + Pu

References 

Plutonium(IV) compounds
Fluorides
Metal halides
Nuclear materials
Actinide halides